WKRA-FM (92.7 MHz) and WKRA (1110 kHz) are commercial radio stations licensed to Holly Springs, Mississippi and serving the Memphis metropolitan area. They are owned by Billy R. Autry, and they simulcast an urban gospel radio format with some Christian talk and teaching programs.  The radio studios and offices are on Memphis Street in Holly Springs.

WKRA is powered at 1,000 watts non-directional.  But because AM 1110 is a clear channel frequency reserved for Class A WBT in Charlotte, North Carolina, WKRA is a daytimer.  It must sign off at night to avoid interference.  WKRA-FM has an effective radiated power (ERP) of 3,000 watts and broadcasts around the clock.

History
WKRA went on the air a decade earlier, .

References

External links
 Official Website
 FCC Public Inspection File for WKRA-FM
 FCC History Card for WKRA-FM
 

Radio stations established in 1977
1977 establishments in Mississippi
Gospel radio stations in the United States
Marshall County, Mississippi
KRA-FM